The National Museum of Anthropology, formerly known as the Museum of the Filipino People, is a component museum of the National Museum of the Philippines which houses Ethnological and Archaeological exhibitions. It is located in the Agrifina Circle, Rizal Park, Manila adjacent to the National Museum of Fine Arts building.

Built  from a neoclassical design by Canadian-American architect Ralph Harrington Doane when he was consulting architect to the Philippine government, the building formerly housed the Department of Finance. It also houses the wreck of the San Diego, ancient artifacts, and zoology divisions.

Current galleries and offices

Ground floor

Ifugao House / Courtyard
Office of the Exhibition, Editorial, and Media Production Services Division
Office of the Museum Foundation of the Philippines
Office of the Archaeology Division 
Office of the Ethnology Division
Office of the Maritime and Underwater Cultural Heritage Division
National Museum Library

Second floor

Marble Hall
The San Diego: 500 Years of Maritime Trade 
Garing: The Philippines at the Crossroads of Ivory Trade

Third floor

Lantaka: Of War and Peace
Manlilikha ng Bayan Hall (National Living Treasure)
Lumad: Mindanao 
Faith, Tradition and Place: Bangsamoro Art from the National Ethnographic Collection 
Kaban ng Lahi (Archaeological Treasures)
Biyay: Traditional Ecological Knowledge among Philippine Negrito Communities

Fourth floor

Reception Hall (Changing Gallery)
Rice, Biodiversity and Climate Change 
Hibla ng Lahing Filipino: The Artistry of Philippine Textiles
Baybayin: Ancient and Traditional Scripts of the Philippines
Entwined Spheres: Mats and Baskets as Containers, Costumes and Conveyors
Office of the Museum Services Division

Fifth floor

National Ethnographic Collection Repositories

See also 
 National Museum of the Philippines

References

External links
  National Museum: Museum of the Filipino People
  Museum of the Filipino People: Home to the Anthropology and Archaeology Divisions of the National Museum of the Philippines

National Museum of the Philippines
Museums in Manila
Buildings and structures in Ermita
Neoclassical architecture in the Philippines
Archaeological museums
Anthropology museums